Thomas Rudston (by 1507 – 1556), of Swaffham Bulbeck, Cambridgeshire, was an English politician.

Education
Rudston was educated at Gray's Inn.

Career
He was a Member (MP) of the Parliament of England for Cambridgeshire in 1542.

References

1556 deaths
People from East Cambridgeshire District
English MPs 1542–1544
Year of birth uncertain